NPAS1 is a basic helix-loop-helix transcription factor.

See also
 NPAS3

References

External links
 

Transcription factors
PAS-domain-containing proteins